City Tower may refer to:

 City Tower, Manchester
 City Tower, Liverpool
 City Tower (Prague)
 City Tower (Trnava)
 Sheraton City Tower, a skyscraper in Ramat Gan, Israel
 City Point (Brooklyn), a mixed-used development, one of which is called "City Tower"